Marry in Haste is a 1924 American silent comedy drama film directed by Duke Worne and starring William Fairbanks, Dorothy Revier, and Alfred Hollingsworth.

Plot
As described in a film magazine review, Wayne Sturgis of Wyoming while visiting New York City meets and weds Joan Prescott, a Greenwich Village art student making a living by modeling. His wealthy father disowns him as a result of the marriage. They live on a small farm where the hard work brings disillusionment, unhappiness, and ill health to Joan. Trouble also arises due to the attentions paid to the young wife by a neighbor, Monte Brett. Wayne desperately struggles to make good and wins some much needed money by staying three rounds with a champion pugilist. Brett attempts to make love to Joan but is repulsed by her. In the finale, the father is reconciled and forgives the young couple, who find happiness with each other.

Cast
 William Fairbanks as Wayne Sturgis
 Dorothy Revier as Joan Prescott
 Alfred Hollingsworth as Manager
 Gladden James as Monte Brett
 William Dyer as Champion
 Al Kaufman as Jack Dugan
 Pat J. O'Brien as Bit Part (uncredited)

References

Bibliography
 Munden, Kenneth White. The American Film Institute Catalog of Motion Pictures Produced in the United States, Part 1. University of California Press, 1997.

External links

 

1924 films
1924 comedy films
1920s English-language films
American silent feature films
Silent American comedy films
Films directed by Duke Worne
1920s American films